Chhattisgarh Board of Secondary Education (abbreviated as CGBSE) is a board of education in state of Chhattisgarh, India. CGBSE is state agency of Government of Chhattisgarh in India, it is responsible for promotion and development of secondary education in Chhattisgarh. The Board has conducted its exams independently from the year 2002, and conducts High School, Higher Secondary and Diploma Courses.

The various FUNCTIONS of the Board as mentioned in the CGBSE website are:

 Highschool / Higher Secondary / Higher Secondary Professional / Physical Training Certificate Test Certificate and D.Ed. Operation of the examinations. 
 Instructions for the proposed curriculum for the Chhattisgarh Secondary Education Board and advise the government for the creation of textbooks. 
 Recognition of High School and Higher Secondary Schools located in Chhattisgarh
 Take all necessary steps to raise the level of Chhattisgarh Secondary Education Board. 
 Encourage students and teachers to encourage and motivate them

Establishment 
After the formation of Chhattisgarh state on 1 November 2000, Chhattisgarh government School Education Department was upgraded to Chhattisgarh Board of Secondary Education on 20 September 2001 under Legislative Notification No. 10-5-/13/2001-Raipur-20-7-2001.

Examinations 
CGBSE conducts the examinations for Class 10 and Class 12 every year in the month of March. The results are declared by the end of May. 
 High School leaving certificate exam (regular / self study / correspondence)
 Higher Secondary School leaving certificate exam (regular / self study / correspondence)
 Higher Secondary (Professional) School leaving certificate exam (regular / self study)
 Diploma in Education (regular / correspondence)
 Diploma in Physical Education

See also 
 Education in Chhattisgarh
 Central Board of Secondary Education (CBSE), India
 National Institute of Open Schooling (NIOS), India
 Indian Certificate of Secondary Education (ICSE), India
 Indian School Certificate (ISC),India
 Council for the Indian School Certificate Examinations (CISCE), India
 Secondary School Leaving Certificate (SSLC), India

References

External links 
 

State secondary education boards of India
State agencies of Chhattisgarh
Education in Chhattisgarh
2000 establishments in Chhattisgarh
Government agencies established in 2000